The 1971–72 Texaco Cup was the second edition of the tournament sponsored by Texaco. It was won by Derby County, who beat Airdrieonians in a two-legged final by 2–1 on aggregate.

First round 1st leg

First round 2nd leg

Quarter-finals 1st leg

Quarter-finals 2nd leg

Semi-finals 1st leg

Semi-finals 2nd leg

Final 1st leg

Final 2nd leg

Notes and references

1971–72 in English football
1971–72 in Northern Ireland association football
1971–72 in Republic of Ireland association football
1971–72 in Scottish football
England–Scotland relations